Fo or FO may refer to:

Arts and entertainment
 Fallout (video game), a 1997 video game
 Fo Fai, a character in the Battle Arena Toshinden video game series
 Folio (printing), a book size, the page number of books, or sheets with multiple printed pages
 Foreign Objects (band), a Pennsylvania music group
 FunOrb, a 2008 Java-based gaming website

Businesses and organisations
 Airlines of Tasmania (IATA airline designator),  airline of Tasmania, Australia
 Family office, an investing office controlled by a family
 Felix Airways (IATA airline designator), a regional airline of Yemen
 Football Outsiders, a website devoted to statistical analysis of the NFL
 Force Ouvrière, a French trade unions confederation
 Foreign Office, a department of the United Kingdom government, currently named Foreign, Commonwealth and Development Office
 Flybondi (IATA airline designator), airline of Argentina

Mathematics, science and technology

Computing

 FO (complexity), a complexity class

 .fo, the country code top level domain (ccTLD) for Faroe Islands

 Fiber optic
 XSL Formatting Objects (XSL-FO), a markup language

Other uses in mathematics, science, and technology
 Fan out (FO), number of loads at the output of a ring oscillator
 First-order logic, a system of mathematical logic
 Forsterite, magnesium-rich end-member in the olivine solid solution series 
 Fourier number (Fo) in physics
 Fuel factor (Fo), used to check the accuracy of an emission measurement system
 Fuel oil, also called Furnace Oil
 FO, a subunit of F1FO type ATPase enzyme

Military or aeronautical roles
 Field officer, a senior army officer
 First Officer, or co-pilot on an airliner
 Flying officer, a Royal Air Force rank
 Forward Observer, a soldier who directs artillery fire

People
 Dario Fo (1926–2016), Italian playwright and Nobel laureate
 Fo Porter, a contestant on America's Next Top Model, Cycle 12
 Fó or Fú (佛、仏), the Chinese name for Buddha
 Franco-ontarien, referring to a French-speaking citizen of the (largely anglophone) Canadian province of Ontario, Canada

Places
 Faroe Islands, ISO 3166-1 country code, FO
 .fo, the country code top level domain (ccTLD) for Faroe Islands
 Faroese language (language code fo), a North Germanic language 
 Fô Department of the Houet Province of Burkina Faso
 , the chief town in Fo Department
 Province of Forlì, Italy
 Fort Ord, California

Other uses
 Face Off (disambiguation)
 Faroese language (language code fo), a North Germanic language
 Foreign object (disambiguation)
 Front office, an area where visitors arrive and first encounter a staff at a place of business
 Fuck off (disambiguation), an English expletive, and various other meanings
 Furka Oberalp Railway, a Swiss railway
 Follow-on, a practice of making a team bat multiple innings in a row in cricket

See also
Foe (disambiguation)
 Pho